The South East Multi-County Agency Narcotics Task Force (SEMCA) is a multi-jurisdictional agency that provides policing services to Richland, Ransom and Sargent Counties in North Dakota and Wilkin County in Minnesota.   The group does not maintain a web site and public documentation is scarce.  Known members include:
 North Dakota Bureau of Criminal Investigations 
 Ransom County Sheriff's Office
 Richland County Sheriff's Office
 Sargent County Sheriff Office (sic.)
 Breckenridge Police Department (Minnesota)
 Lisbon Police Department (North Dakota)
 Wahpeton Police Department (North Dakota) 

The agency seems to handle about 150 cases a year.

SEMCA was implicated in the death of Andrew Sadek and sued by Sadek's parents in 2016.

References

Law enforcement agencies of North Dakota